During the 2008–09 French football season, Olympique de Marseille competed in Ligue 1.

Season summary
Marseille finished 3 points behind league champions Bordeaux. Manager Eric Gerets left after his contract expired at the end of the season. Replacing him was former Marseille player Didier Deschamps.

First-team squad
Squad at end of season

Left club during season

Competitions

Ligue 1

League table

Results summary

Results by round

Matches

Source:

Coupe de France

Coupe de la Ligue

Champions League

Third qualifying round

Group C

UEFA Cup

Round of 32

Round of 16

Quarter-finals

Notes and references

Notes

References

Olympique de Marseille seasons
Olympique de Marseille